Lt.-General Godfrey Bosville Macdonald, 3rd Baron Macdonald of Sleat (14 October 1775 Edinburgh, Scotland – 13 October 1832 Bridlington, England) was the second son of Alexander Macdonald, 1st Baron Macdonald (c.1745–1795) and Elizabeth Diana Bosville (1748–1789). He succeeded his elder brother Alexander Macdonald, 2nd Baron Macdonald, in the barony on 19 June 1824, after the former died unmarried and without legitimate issue.

Education

He was educated at Harrow School, Harrow on the Hill, London, England. He matriculated Oriel College, University of Oxford, Oxford, Oxfordshire, England, on 17 December 1792.

Career
He gained the rank of ensign, in 1794, serving in the Loyal Kelso Regiment and the King's Royal Rifle Corps. He then gained the rank of captain, in 1796, serving in the 86th Regiment of Foot and the rank of lieutenant, that same year, while serving with the 70th (Surrey) Regiment of Foot. He then gained the ranks of major, in the service of the 55th Regiment of Foot, and lieutenant-colonel, in the service of the South Wales Borderers. He gained the rank of lieutenant-colonel in 1808 in the service of the Grenadier Guards. He gained the ranks of brevet colonel, in 1811, the rank of major-general, in 1814, and of lieutenant-general, in 1830.

He fought in the expedition to Ostend in 1798 and then in the British West Indies from 1801 to 1802. He fought in the recapture of the Cape of Good Hope between 1805 and 1806, under Sir David Baird, 1st Baronet. He fought in the Peninsular War in 1812.

Marriage and issue

On 29 December 1803 in Norwich, Norfolk, England, he married Louisa Maria La Coast (4 February 1781, Esher, Surrey, England – 10 February 1835, Bossall, Yorkshire, England), said to have been the illegitimate daughter of Prince William Henry, Duke of Gloucester and Edinburgh (1743–1805) and Lady Almeria Carpenter, a daughter of George Carpenter, 1st Earl of Tyrconnell, but baptised at Leatherhead in 1781 as the daughter of Farley Edser. They had three children born before their marriage (legitimized by Scottish law, but not by Irish law) and ten children born after their marriage.

 Alexander William Robert Bosville (12 September 1800 – 22 September 1847); his daughter Julia married the 8th Baron Middleton
 William Macdonald (1801 – c. 1805)
 Louisa Bosville Macdonald (16 September 1802 – 1 September 1854); married John Hope, 5th Earl of Hopetoun. Her descendants are the Marquesses of Linlithgow
 Hon. Elizabeth Diana Bosville Macdonald (27 February 1804 – 9 June 1839)
 Hon. Julia Bosville Macdonald (30 October 1805 – 11 June 1884)
 Hon. Susan Hussey Bosville Macdonald (25 August 1807 – 5 November 1879)
 Godfrey William Wentworth Bosville-Macdonald, 4th Baron Macdonald (16 March 1809 – 25 July 1863)
 General Hon. James William Bosville Macdonald (born 31 October 1810)
 Hon. Diana Bosville Macdonald (12 April 1812 – 8 December 1880); her daughter Diana Smyth married Henry Lascelles, 4th Earl of Harewood
 Hon. Jane Bosville Macdonald (25 May 1815 – 13 January 1888)
 Hon. Marianne Bosville Macdonald (27 July 1816 – 12 July 1876); married Captain Henry Martin Turnor, son of Edmund Turnor; their daughter married the 3rd Earl of Eldon
 Hon. William Bosville Macdonald (27 September 1817 – 11 May 1847)
 Hon. Octavia Sophia Bosville Macdonald (c. 1819 – 22 January 1897)

Inheritance and name changes
He was the heir of his uncle William Bosville who died unmarried in 1813, having left him nearly the whole of his fortune and estates, including Gunthwaite in Yorkshire. In accordance with the terms of the bequest, by royal licence on 11 April 1814 he changed his surname to Bosville and later on 20 July 1824 to Bosville-Macdonald.

Notes

References
 

1775 births
1832 deaths
People educated at Harrow School
Alumni of Oriel College, Oxford
British Army generals
British Army personnel of the French Revolutionary Wars
British Army personnel of the Napoleonic Wars
King's Royal Rifle Corps officers
South Wales Borderers officers
Grenadier Guards officers
55th Regiment of Foot officers
East Surrey Regiment officers
Sleat, Godfrey Macdonald, 8th Lord
3